The Batylykh Formation is a geological formation in Yakutia, Russia. It is of an uncertain Early Cretaceous age, probably dating between the Berriasian and the Barremian. The mudstones, sandstones and shales of the formation were deposited in a fluvial to lacustrine environment.

Fossil content 
The formation is best known for the Teete locality, which has revealed remains of numerous vertebrates, including sauropods, and other dinosaur teeth as well as numerous species of mammal, including Sangarotherium, Khorotherium and tritylodontid Xenocretosuchus. as well as choristodere Khurendukhosaurus.

Other fossils recovered from the formation are:

Mammals
 Cryoharamiya tarda
 cf. Sineleutherus sp.
 Docodonta indet.
Reptiles
 Ankylosauria indet.
 Coelurosauria indet.
 Lacertilia indet.
 Macronaria indet.
 Mesochelydia indet.
 Stegosauria indet.
 Theropoda indet.
Amphibians
 Kulgeriherpeton ultimus
 Anura indet.
 Caudata indet.
Fish
 Chondrostei indet.
 Palaeoniscidae indet.
Insects
 Crenoptychoptera gronskayae
 Zhiganka comitans
Bivalves
 Bivalvia indet.
Gastropods
 Gastropoda indet.
Flora
 Podocarpus multesima
 Selaginella velata
 Stereisporites compactus
 S. congregatus
 Tripartina variabilis
 Ginkgocycadophytus sp.
 Klukisporites sp.
 Leiotriletes sp.
 Ophyoglossum sp.
 Piceapollenites sp.
 Picea sp.
 Pinus sp.
 Selaginella sp.
 Stereisporites sp.
 Pinaceae indet.

Gallery

See also 
 List of fossiliferous stratigraphic units in Russia
 Bukachacha Formation, contemporaneous fossiliferous formation of Zabaykalsky Krai

References

Bibliography

Further reading 
 I. P. Tolmachoff. 1904. Neue Funde zur Geologie Sibiriens [New discoveries about the geology of Siberia]. Centralblatt für Mineralogie, Geologie und Paläontologie 1904(1):233-234

Geologic formations of Russia
Lower Cretaceous Series of Asia
Cretaceous Russia
Barremian Stage
Hauterivian Stage
Valanginian Stage
Shale formations
Sandstone formations
Siltstone formations
Fluvial deposits
Lacustrine deposits
Fossiliferous stratigraphic units of Asia
Paleontology in Russia
Formations